The black-chinned quailfinch (Ortygospiza atricollis gabonensis) also known as the red-billed quailfinch, is a common subspecies of estrildid finch found in central Africa. It has an estimated global extent of occurrence of 450,000 km2.  It is found in Angola, Burundi, the Republic of Congo, the Democratic Republic of the Congo, Equatorial Guinea, Gabon,  Rwanda, Tanzania and Zambia. The IUCN has classified the species as being of least concern. Some taxonomists consider it to be conspecific with the other species of quailfinch.

References

External links
BirdLife International species factsheet

black-chinned quailfinch
Birds of Central Africa
black-chinned quailfinch